Diuraphis is a genus of true bugs belonging to the family Aphididae.

The species of this genus are found in Europe, Central Asia and Northern America.

Species:
 Diuraphis agrostidis (Muddathir, 1965) 
 Diuraphis bromicola (Hille Ris Lambers, 1959) 
 Russian wheat aphid (Diuraphis noxia)
 Western wheat aphid (Diuraphis tritici)  Gillette

References

Aphididae